Tin Tsz may refer to:
 Tin Tsz Estate, a public housing estate in Tin Shui Wai, Hong Kong
 Tin Tsz stop, an MTR Light Rail stop adjacent to the estate